The 2022 Drive for the Cure 250 presented by BlueCross BlueShield of North Carolina was the 29th stock car race of the 2022 NASCAR Xfinity Series, the final race of the Round of 12, and the 50th iteration of the event. The race was held on Saturday, October 8, 2022, in Concord, North Carolina at the Charlotte Motor Speedway Roval, a  permanent road course. The race was increased from 67 laps to 72 laps, due to several NASCAR overtime finishes. A. J. Allmendinger, driving for Kaulig Racing, held off Ty Gibbs in the final few laps to earn his 15th career NASCAR Xfinity Series win, and his fifth of the season. To fill out the podium, Noah Gragson, driving for JR Motorsports, would finish 3rd, respectively. Allmendinger and Gibbs would mostly dominate, leading 25 and 24 laps.

Eight drivers would advance into the next round of the playoffs: Noah Gragson, A. J. Allmendinger, Ty Gibbs, Justin Allgaier, Josh Berry, Austin Hill, Brandon Jones, and Sam Mayer. Ryan Sieg, Daniel Hemric, Riley Herbst, and Jeremy Clements would fail to advance.

This was the debut race for the former F1 driver, Daniil Kvyat, and the current IndyCar driver, Marco Andretti.

Background 
Since 2018, deviating from past NASCAR events at Charlotte, the race will utilize a road course configuration of Charlotte Motor Speedway, promoted and trademarked as the "Roval".

During July 2018 tests on the road course, concerns were raised over drivers "cheating" the backstretch chicane on the course. The chicanes were modified with additional tire barriers and rumble strips in order to encourage drivers to properly drive through them, and NASCAR will enforce drive-through penalties on drivers who illegally "short-cut" parts of the course. The chicanes will not be used during restarts.  In the summer of 2019, the bus stop on the backstretch was changed and deepened, becoming a permanent part of the circuit, compared to the previous year where it was improvised.

If a driver fails to legally make the backstretch bus stop, the driver must skip the frontstretch chicane and make a complete stop by the dotted line on the exit before being allowed to continue.  A driver who misses the frontstretch chicane must stop before the exit.

Entry list 

 (R) denotes rookie driver.
 (i) denotes driver who are ineligible for series driver points.

Practice 
The only 20-minute practice session was held on Saturday, October 8, at 10:00 AM EST.

Qualifying 
Qualifying was held on Saturday, October 8, at 10:30 AM EST. Since the Charlotte Motor Speedway Roval is a road course, the qualifying system used is a two group system, with two rounds. Drivers will be separated into two groups, Group A and Group B. Each driver will have a lap to set a time. The fastest 5 drivers from each group will advance to the final round. The fastest driver to set a time in the round will win the pole.

Race results 
Stage 1 Laps: 20

Stage 2 Laps: 20

Stage 3 Laps: 32*

Standings after the race 

Drivers' Championship standings

Note: Only the first 12 positions are included for the driver standings.

References 

2022 NASCAR Xfinity Series
NASCAR races at Charlotte Motor Speedway
Drive for the Cure 250
Drive for the Cure 250